Gajre is a village in the municipality of Tetovo, North Macedonia.

History
According to the 1467-68 Ottoman defter, Gajre (then known as Garje or Gara) appears as being largely inhabited by an Orthodox Christian Albanian population. Due to Slavicisation, some families had a mixed Slav-Albanian anthroponomy - usually a Slavic first name and an Albanian last name or last names with Albanian patronyms and Slavic suffixes. 

The names are: Shtefo Arbanas; Kola, his brother; Tashko, son of Shtefo; Dimetri, son of Kole; Nikolla, star; Gjon, his son; Jovan, his brother; Gjon, brother of Berishliq; Daba, his son; Gjon, son of Nikolla; Jovan, son of Nikolla; Vasil, son of Nikolla; Stepan, son of Nikolla; Todor, son of Nikolla; Niko, son of Kola; Cvetko, son of Kola; Kojlo Domazat; Dimitri, his son.

Demographics
According to the 2021 census, the village had a total of 633 inhabitants. Ethnic groups in the village include:

Albanians 607
Others 26

References

External links

Villages in Tetovo Municipality
Albanian communities in North Macedonia